Chris Cokley (born July 27, 1996) is an American basketball player who last played for AS Douanes of the Basketball Africa League (BAL). He competed in college for the UAB Blazers.

Early life
Cokley is the son of Angela Green and he grew up on the east side of Savannah, Georgia. He first began playing basketball at the age of five and learned the game at the Blackshear Community Center. Cokley developed into a star at Savannah High School, where he was coached by Tim Jordan. He led the team to the GHSA Class 5A finals as a sophomore. As a junior, he passed out in a state quarterfinal game against Washington County High School and missed the semifinal game, but returned in the state finals.

College career
Cokley was recruited to the University of Alabama at Birmingham (UAB), where he earned regular minutes on a Blazers team that reached the NCAA Tournament as a No. 14 seed and defeated No. 3 seed Iowa State in the first round of the tournament. As a sophomore, Cokley partnered with William Lee in the frontcourt to win the C-USA regular-season championship and set a school record with 26 wins. Cokley posted 13.1 points and 6.5 rebounds per game as a sophomore and was selected to the Second Team All-Conference USA. in 2016 Cokley averaged 12.1 points per game as a junior, second on the team to Lee. As a senior, Cokley averaged 16.9 points, 8.7 rebounds and 1.5 steals per game and started 29 of 32 games. He was named to the First Team All-Conference USA. Cokley finished third all-time in UAB history in scoring (1,660) and second in rebounding (857). After his senior season, he was invited to the Portsmouth Invitational Tournament.

Professional career
After going undrafted in the 2018 NBA draft, Cokley was signed by the Charlotte Hornets in the NBA Summer League. Cokley signed his first professional contract with the German team Rasta Vechta on July 30, 2018. However, he left the team on September 9, before appearing in any games. On September 16, Cokley signed with Ukrainian club Cherkaski Mavpy.

On September 10, 2019, he has signed with Rabotnički of the Macedonian First League.  Few weeks later, he left the club. Cokley joined BC Khimik in Ukraine. On February 24, 2020, Cokley joined AB Contern in Luxembourg.

In April 2021, Cokley signed with the Senegalese club AS Douanes to play in the 2021 BAL season.

On November 24, 2021, he joined BKM Lučenec of the Slovak Basketball League (SBL).

The Basketball Tournament
Cokley played for the Texas Matadors in The Basketball Tournament in 2018. He had 20 points in the 82–73 loss to Scarlet and Gray in the Super 16. Cokley joined Herd That, a team composed primarily of Marshall alumni, in The Basketball Tournament 2020. He scored 32 points in a 102–99 come-from-behind win over the Money Team in the second round. Cokley scored 17 points as Herd That fell to Overseas Elite 93–76 in the quarterfinals.

BAL career statistics

|-
| style="text-align:left;"|2021
| style="text-align:left;"|AS Douanes
| 4 || 1 || 17.1 || .375 || .333 || .667 || 2.8 || 3.3 || 1.0 || .0 || 5.8
|-
|- class="sortbottom"
| style="text-align:center;" colspan="2"|Career
| 4 || 1 || 17.1 || .375 || .333 || .667 || 2.8 || 3.3 || 1.0 || .0 || 5.8

References

External links
UAB Blazers bio

1996 births
Living people
AS Douanes basketball players
American men's basketball players
American expatriate basketball people in Ukraine
American expatriate basketball people in Luxembourg
Basketball players from Savannah, Georgia
Power forwards (basketball)
UAB Blazers men's basketball players